Harpalus roninus is a species of ground beetle in the subfamily Harpalinae. It was described by Henry Walter Bates in 1873.

References

roninus
Beetles described in 1873